is a Japanese school in West Coast, Singapore. It is affiliated with Waseda University in Shinjuku, Tokyo, making it a regional branch of a Japanese private school, and is located on the city-state's western coast. The school is operated by Waseda Shibuya Senior High School Pte. Ltd.

History
The opening 10th-grade class included 50 Japanese students whose families lived in Singapore, Brunei, Malaysia, and Thailand. As of 1991 it was the only Japanese overseas boarding senior high school outside of the United States and Europe. (田村 哲夫 Tamura Tetsuo), who had served as the head of the Shibuya Kyouiku Gakuen, stated that he wished to establish an overseas Japanese school in Asia after learning about the sense of alienation from society many Japanese felt after returning from overseas. Tamura established a regional branch in Asia because he believed other Japanese international schools were too oriented to Europe and the United States.

The school first opened in a temporary facility for a local Japanese kindergarten. The Singaporean government leased  of land to the school on terms described by Toshio Iwasaki of the Journal of Japanese Trade & Industry as "very favorable". In mid-1991 the construction of the school buildings, athletic facilities, and dormitory facilities finished. In September 1991, the students moved into the permanent campus for the second semester of the school year.

In April 2002 the school became affiliated with Waseda University. The school was renamed as "Waseda Shibuya Senior High School" to reflect the change.

Admissions and Academic Information
The school also accepts graduates of Japanese junior high schools in Singapore and across the Asian region.

About 60% of this school's graduates move on to Waseda University. Other universities that have accepted students from Waseda Shibuya include Doshisha University, Hosei University, Kwansei University, Rikkyo University, and Ritsumeikan University.

The annual school festival is usually held in September, it was last held in 2018.

Facilities
The school maintains dormitories, allowing students whose parents are transferred overseas to complete their high school education. The boarding school has 187 single occupancy rooms, with 116 for boys and 71 for girls. Currently, about 50% of the students reside in dormitories, while the remaining students reside with their families in Singapore. 

The school has an astronomical observatory. As of 1991, as part of a Japan-Singapore educational exchange, the school opened the observatory to students attending local Singaporean secondary schools.

References

Further reading

 桑原 汎 and 松本 卓. "シンガポールに生きる(38)現地高校に国際人養成の夢を託して--早稲田渋谷シンガポール校事務局長 桑原汎さん." シンガポール 2003(1), 20-24, 2003-03. 日本シンガポール協会. See profile at CiNii.

See also

 Singapore-Japan relations
 Japanese people in Singapore
 The Japanese School Singapore (Japanese elementary and junior high school in Singapore)

External links

 Waseda Shibuya Senior High School in Singapore
 Waseda Shibuya Senior High School in Singapore 
  

Japanese international schools in Singapore
Waseda University
Boarding schools in Singapore
Educational institutions established in 1991
Shiritsu zaigai kyōiku shisetsu
1991 establishments in Singapore